Algésiras was a second-rank, 90-gun, steam-powered ship of the line built for the French Navy in the 1850s, lead ship of her class of five ships. The ship participated in the Second Italian War of Independence in 1859.

Description
The Algésiras-class ships were repeats of the pioneering ship of the line  and were also designed by naval architect Henri Dupuy de Lôme. Their crew numbered 913 officers and ratings.

The primary difference between Napoléon and the Algésiras class was that the boilers of the latter ships were moved forward of the engines. They were powered by a pair of two-cylinder horizontal-return connecting-rod steam engines, also designed by Dupuy de Lôme, that drove the single propeller shaft using steam provided by eight boilers. The engines were rated at 900 nominal horsepower and produced . The ships were fitted with three masts and ship rigged.

The armament of the Algésiras-class ships consisted of eighteen 36-pounder smoothbore cannon and sixteen  Paixhans guns on the lower gundeck and thirty-four 30-pounder  cannon on the upper gundeck. On the quarterdeck and forecastle were twenty  Paixhans guns and a pair of 163 mm rifled muzzle-loading guns.

Career 
In 1859, she took part in the blockade of Venice and various operations in the Mediterranean during the Second Italian War of Independence.

She was decommissioned in 1865 and used as a transport. She was later used as a school ship.

On 25 November 1906, she was destroyed in Toulon by an accidental fire.

Citations

References

Ships of the line of the French Navy
Algésiras-class ships of the line
1855 ships
Ships built in France
Ship fires
Napoléon-class ships of the line